Mayflower Village is a census-designated place (CDP) in the San Gabriel Valley, in Los Angeles County, California, United States. The population was 5,515 at the 2010 census, up from 5,081 at the 2000 census. The ZIP Codes serving the community are 91006, which is served by Arcadia and 91016, which is served by Monrovia.

Geography

Demographics

2010
At the 2010 census Mayflower Village had a population of 5,515. The racial makeup of Mayflower Village was 2,929 (53.1%) White (37.1% Non-Hispanic White), 83 (1.5%) African American, 28 (0.5%) Native American, 1,734 (31.4%) Asian, 4 (0.1%) Pacific Islander, 491 (8.9%) from other races, and 246 (4.5%) from two or more races. Hispanic or Latino of any race were 1,521 persons (27.6%).

The census reported that 5,511 people (99.9% of the population) lived in households, 4 (0.1%) lived in non-institutionalized group quarters, and no one was institutionalized.

There were 1,905 households, 656 (34.4%) had children under the age of 18 living in them, 1,078 (56.6%) were opposite-sex married couples living together, 249 (13.1%) had a female householder with no husband present, 98 (5.1%) had a male householder with no wife present.  There were 81 (4.3%) unmarried opposite-sex partnerships, and 9 (0.5%) same-sex married couples or partnerships. 385 households (20.2%) were one person and 177 (9.3%) had someone living alone who was 65 or older. The average household size was 2.89.  There were 1,425 families (74.8% of households); the average family size was 3.34.

The age distribution was 1,197 people (21.7%) under the age of 18, 435 people (7.9%) aged 18 to 24, 1,433 people (26.0%) aged 25 to 44, 1,692 people (30.7%) aged 45 to 64, and 758 people (13.7%) who were 65 or older.  The median age was 41.1 years. For every 100 females, there were 92.5 males.  For every 100 females age 18 and over, there were 89.7 males.

There were 1,975 housing units at an average density of 2,875.7 per square mile, of the occupied units 1,559 (81.8%) were owner-occupied and 346 (18.2%) were rented. The homeowner vacancy rate was 1.0%; the rental vacancy rate was 6.0%.  4,464 people (80.9% of the population) lived in owner-occupied housing units and 1,047 people (19.0%) lived in rental housing units.

According to the 2010 United States Census, Mayflower Village had a median household income of $76,461, with 5.6% of the population living below the federal poverty line.

2000
According to the census of 2000, there were 5,081 people, 1,825 households, and 1,315 families in the CDP. The population density was 7,652.3 inhabitants per square mile (2,972.4/km). The racial makeup of the CDP was 66.38% White, 1.18% African American, 0.69% Native American, 16.55% Asian, 0.18% Pacific Islander, 10.35% from other races, and 4.66% from two or more races. Hispanic or Latino of any race were 26.61% of the population.

Of the 1,825 households 32.9% had children under the age of 18 living with them, 56.8% were married couples living together, 10.6% had a female householder with no husband present, and 27.9% were non-families. 22.8% of households were one person and 10.9% were one person aged 65 or older.  The average household size was 2.78 and the average family size was 3.30.

The age distribution was 24.7% under the age of 18, 6.6% from 18 to 24, 30.3% from 25 to 44, 23.8% from 45 to 64, and 14.6% 65 or older.  The median age was 38 years. For every 100 females, there were 93.9 males.  For every 100 females age 18 and over, there were 90.5 males.

The median household income was $55,547 and the median family income  was $63,814. Males had a median income of $40,783 versus $35,634 for females. The per capita income for the CDP was $21,790.  About 6.7% of families and 7.0% of the population were below the poverty line, including 8.1% of those under age 18 and 8.7% of those age 65 or over.

Government

References

Communities in the San Gabriel Valley
Census-designated places in Los Angeles County, California
Census-designated places in California